On 29 January 2010, the IUCN Red List of Threatened Species identified 149 data deficient species in the Cnidaria phylum (Animalia kingdom).

Anthozoa

Actiniaria

Edwardsiidae

Scleractinia

Acroporidae

Agariciidae

Astrocoeniidae

Caryophylliidae

Dendrophylliidae

Euphylliidae

Faviidae

Flabellidae

Fungiidae

Meandrinidae

Merulinidae

Mussidae

Oculinidae

Pectiniidae

Pocilloporidae

Poritidae

Siderastreidae

Turbinoliidae

Hydrozoa

Milleporina

Milleporidae

References
 IUCN 2009. IUCN Red List of Threatened Species, v2009.2. Source of the above list: online IUCN Red List. Retrieved d.d. 29 January 2010.

Cnidaria